A military government is generally any form of government that is administered by military forces, whether or not this government is legal under the laws of the jurisdiction at issue, and whether this government is formed by natives or by an occupying power. It is usually carried out by military workers.

Types of military government include:
 Military occupation of acquired foreign territory and the administration thereof
 Martial law, temporary military rule of domestic territory
 Military dictatorship, an authoritarian government controlled by a military and its political designees, called a military junta when done extralegally
 Military junta, a government led by a committee of military leaders.
 Stratocracy, a government traditionally or constitutionally run by a military.

.
Forms of government